Serikzhan Urstemuly Muzhikov (Serıkjan Urstemūly Mūjyqov; born 17 June 1989) is a Kazakhstan international football player who plays for FC Tobol in the Kazakhstan Premier League.

Career
Muzhikov began his career in 2006 with FC Koksu. He has been playing for FC Zhetysu since 2008.

In July 2015, Muzhikov returned to FC Astana, signing an eighteen-month contract. On 6 January 2020, Muzhikov left Astana at the end of his contract. On 22 January 2020, FC Tobol announced the signing of Muzhikov on a one-year contract.

Career statistics

Club

International

Statistics accurate as of match played 9 September 2019

International goals
Scores and results list Kazakhstan's goal tally first.

References

1989 births
Living people
Kazakhstani footballers
Kazakhstan international footballers
Kazakhstan under-21 international footballers
Kazakhstan Premier League players
FC Zhetysu players
FC Astana players
FC Kaisar players
Association football midfielders
People from Taldykorgan